Icelander can refer to:
A person from the country of Iceland, see Icelanders.
Icelander (novel), by Dustin Long, published in 2006 by McSweeney's.
Íslendingur (ship), a replica Viking ship whose name means Icelander

See also
Icelandic (disambiguation)